Madison Paige Lilley (born April 15, 1999) is an American professional volleyball player who plays as a setter. She currently plays professionally for French volleyball club Béziers and has played for the United States women's national volleyball team.

Early life

Lilley is from Overland Park, Kansas. She played volleyball for Blue Valley West High School. In her graduating class, she was the #4 ranked national recruit and won the Andi Collins award for best high school setter in the nation. Additionally, she was a two-time Kansas 6A state champion, was the Kansas Gatorade Player of the Year, National Junior Player of the Year, and was a four-time member of the USA Volleyball All-Tournament Team. 

Lilley committed to play for the University of Kentucky as a freshman in high school, attributing her early interest from attending Kentucky volleyball camps since middle school.

Career

College
Lilley is considered to be the most accomplished volleyball player in Kentucky history. She was a four time All-American, led Kentucky to 4 straight SEC titles, as well as the school's first ever NCAA championship in women's volleyball during her senior season. The win was also the SEC's first NCAA title in women's volleyball. Lilley had 53 assists in the championship match and notched a career high 19 digs. Lilley was named the 2020 NCAA Division I Player of the Year and the NCAA championship most outstanding player. In July 2021, she was named SEC Conference Female Athlete of the Year, the first volleyball player in SEC history to earn the award.

Professional clubs

  SC Potsdam (2021–2022)
  Béziers Volley (fr)

USA National Team
While still in college, Lilley made her U.S. national team debut at the 2019 Women's Pan-American Volleyball Cup, earning a gold medal with the team.

Awards and honors

Clubs

 2021–2022 German Bundesliga –  Silver medal, with SC Potsdam.
 2021–2022 German Cup –  Bronze medal, with SC Potsdam.

International

2019  Pan-American Cup, Gold Medal with the U.S. National Team.

College
2020 NCAA Division I women's volleyball tournament, NCAA Champions

AVCA National Player of the Year (2020)
NCAA Tournament Most Outstanding Player (2020)
SEC Player of the Year (2020)
SEC Female Athlete of the Year (2021)
AVCA First Team All-American (2020)
Honda Sports Award winner in volleyball (2020)
AVCA Second Team All-American (2017, 2018, 2019)
All-Big 12 First Team (2018, 2019, 2020)
Volleyball Magazine Second Team All-American (2019)
2021 ESPY Awards Best Female NCAA Athlete Finalist.
SEC Freshman of the Year (2017)

External links
Kentucky Profile

References

1999 births
Living people
Sportspeople from Overland Park, Kansas
American women's volleyball players
Setters (volleyball)
Kentucky Wildcats women's volleyball players
American expatriate sportspeople in Germany
Expatriate volleyball players in Germany
Expatriate volleyball players in France
American expatriate sportspeople in France